All About Steve is a 2009 American comedy film directed by Phil Traill and starring Sandra Bullock, Thomas Haden Church, and Bradley Cooper as the eponymous Steve. The film is the winner of two Golden Raspberry Awards and has a 6% approval rating at Rotten Tomatoes.

Plot
Mary Horowitz, a crossword puzzle writer for the Sacramento Herald, is socially awkward and considers her pet hamster her only true friend. Her parents decide to set her up on a blind date.

Mary's expectations are low, as she tells her hamster. Mary is pleasantly surprised when her date turns out to be handsome and charming Steve Miller, a cameraman for the television news network CCN. Steve does not reciprocate her feelings.

After an attempt at an intimate moment fails, in part because of her awkwardness and inability to stop talking about vocabulary, Steve fakes a phone call about covering the news out of town. Trying to get Mary out of his truck, he tells her he wishes she could be there.

Mary believes Steve, so decides to pursue him. Her obsession gets her fired when she creates a crossword titled "All About Steve". Following her termination, Mary decides to track him around the country in the hopes of winning his affection. She is encouraged by CCN news reporter Hartman Hughes, who hopes to use Mary's encyclopedic knowledge in his reports to help get promoted to news anchor.

On the road, Mary annoys some bus passengers so much, the driver abandons her. She hitchhikes with a trucker named Norm, then meets and travels with a pair of protesters: Elizabeth, a ditzy but sweet and likeable girl, and Howard, who sells apples he carves into celebrities. She gradually grows close to the two.

Steve and crew end up covering a breaking news story: an old mine collapsed with numerous deaf children stuck inside. Initially, it appears that the children are rescued. Mary, who arrives on the scene, accidentally falls into the mine shaft as well while making a beeline for Steve.

It turns out that not all the children have been rescued, and Mary is trapped with one left behind. Steve begins to realize that Mary, in her own unique way, is a beautiful person. Just as she figures a way out, the two are joined by Hartman, who is made to feel guilty by Elizabeth and Howard for getting Mary into this predicament. Mary's rescue plan works, but she lets Hartman take the credit. She finally realizes she does not need Steve to be happy. In a voiceover she says, "If you love someone, set him free; if you have to stalk him, he probably wasn't yours in the first place."

After the end credits, a competitive TV reporter, in despair that Hartman got popularity by jumping into the sinkhole to save Mary, also jumps into it.

Cast

 Sandra Bullock as Mary Magdalene Horowitz
 Bradley Cooper as Steven "Steve" Miller
 Thomas Haden Church as Hartman Hughes
 Ken Jeong as Angus Tran
 DJ Qualls as Howard
 Katy Mixon as Elizabeth
 Beth Grant as Mrs. Horowitz
 Howard Hesseman as Mr. Horowitz
 M. C. Gainey as Norman James "Norm" Durwood
 Luenell as Protester's wife
 Jordan Morris as Protester Winston
 Keith David as Danny
 Holmes Osborne as Soloman
 Jason Jones as Vazquez
 Noah Munck as Student
 Rachel Sterling as Booby Botanist

Production
Production began in July 2007. Parts of the film were shot at Mayfield Senior School in Pasadena, California. Scenes featuring the collapsed mine and sink hole were filmed at The Walt Disney Company's Golden Oak Ranch near Santa Clarita, California. Originally scheduled for release on March 6, 2009, the film was not released until September 4, 2009.

Release
All About Steve opened at #3 behind the previous two weeks' #1 openers, The Final Destination and Inglourious Basterds with $11.2 million. The film grossed $33.8 million at the North American  box office and has a worldwide total of $40.1 million.

Reception

Rotten Tomatoes assigned the film an approval rating of 6% based on 140 reviews with a rating average of 3.1/10. The site's critics consensus states: "All About Steve is an oddly creepy, sour film, featuring a heroine so desperate and peculiar that audiences may be more likely to pity than root for her." Another review aggregator, Metacritic, gave the film an average score of 17 out of 100 based on 27 critics, indicating "overwhelming dislike". Audiences polled by CinemaScore gave the film an average grade of C+ on an A+ to F scale.

Roger Ebert gave the film 1 and a half stars out of 4. Time named it one of the top ten worst chick flicks.

Accolades

The film was nominated for five Golden Raspberry Awards in 2010, including Worst Picture, Worst Director (Phil Traill), Worst Actress (Sandra Bullock), Worst Screenplay (Kim Barker) and Worst Screen Couple (Sandra Bullock and Bradley Cooper). All About Steve ultimately won Worst Actress and Worst Screen Couple. Sandra Bullock accepted the Razzie for Worst Actress, giving out a copy of All About Steve to each member of the audience, promising to attend next year if they all watched to consider if it was "truly the worst performance". When an audience member thanked her for the copies, Bullock replied "You say that now". She won the Academy Award for Best Actress for The Blind Side the next day, making Bullock one of the few performers to win an Academy Award and a Razzie Award in the same year.

References

External links
 
 

2009 films
2000s comedy road movies
2009 romantic comedy films
American comedy road movies
American romantic comedy films
20th Century Fox films
Dune Entertainment films
Films produced by Sandra Bullock
Films scored by Christophe Beck
Golden Raspberry Award winning films
2009 directorial debut films
2000s English-language films
2000s American films